Thiirene is an organosulfur compound with the formula C2H2S.  It can be viewed as a derivative of cyclopropene, but with the methylene group replaced by sulfur.  It is antiaromatic and very labile.

Thiirenes and derivatives
No thiirene has been isolated at room temperature, but they have been observed spectroscopically at low temperatures.

Thiirene-S-oxides and S-alkylthiirinium salts have been characterized by X-ray crystallography.

References

Sulfur heterocycles
Three-membered rings